Between a Rock and a Hard Place is the first studio album by American hip hop duo Artifacts. It was released by Big Beat Records in October 25, 1994. It peaked at number 137 on the Billboard 200 chart, number 2 on the Heatseekers Albums chart, and number 17 on the Top R&B/Hip-Hop Albums chart.

Track listing

Charts

References

External links
 

1994 debut albums
Artifacts (group) albums
Atlantic Records albums
Albums produced by Buckwild